Wesley ‘Wes’ Pritchett (born July 7, 1966) is a former American football linebacker who played three seasons in the National Football League (NFL) for the Miami Dolphins, Buffalo Bills, and Atlanta Falcons.

Career
Pritchett was linebacker for the Notre Dame Fighting Irish between 1985 and leading tackler and all-American on 1988 National Championship team. In 1989 he was drafted by the Miami Dolphins in the 6th round of the NFL draft. Pritchett then played for the Atlanta Falcons in 1991.

In 1988, an article was published in the New York Times about Pritchett, and two other players, Reggie Ho and Frank Stams, about the effort Lou Holtz made to bolster the team after a coaching change. The team went on to win the 1988 National Championship.

In 2013, ESPN published a story by reporter Jerry Barca about Pritchett and the famed 1989 Fiesta Bowl, in with Notre Dame beating West Virginia 34-21, making then National Champions. The same reporter then wrote a book about the team, which included Pritchett, entitled ‘Unbeatable’ in 2013.

In 2013, the New York Times published an article by reporter Tim Rohan entitled “In ’88, Irish Needed Three ‘Knuckleheads’ to Win Title” which profiled Pritchett.

Retirement 
Pritchett retired from professional football in 1991. Pritchett is now a financial advisor.

References 

1966 births
Living people
Players of American football from Georgia (U.S. state)
American football linebackers
People from Atlanta
Notre Dame Fighting Irish football players
Atlanta Falcons players
Miami Dolphins players